The Emergency Service Unit (ESU) is part of the Special Operations Bureau of the New York City Police Department. The unit provides specialized support and advanced equipment to other NYPD units. Members of ESU are cross-trained in multiple disciplines for police, first aid, and rescue work.

ESU is  always on patrol (all three tours, 365 days a year) with 10 Heavy Rescue trucks, each ordinarily manned by a police officer and a sergeant, and often more than twice as many smaller Radio Emergency Patrol vehicles containing two ESU police officers. There are also two or more citywide patrol sergeants or lieutenants in unmarked vehicles on duty at all times to supervise ESU operations where needed. These are called "U-Cars" on the NYPD radio, for example, "U-5".

History
On July 7th, 1925, former Police Commissioner Richard E. Enright established the Emergency Automobile Squad, which was the forerunner to today's ESU. The unit was created in order to address problems with growing urbanization in NYC that were beyond the capabilities of regular patrolmen. The first two units, Squad 1 (Manhattan / Bronx) and Squad 2 (Brooklyn / Queens) were staffed by six sergeants and forty-four officers. In September 1926, Police Commissioner George McLaughlin formed Squad 3, which was dedicated to the Bronx. It was also at that time that the name was changed from Emergency Automobile Squad to the Emergency Service Squad. In May 1928, Police Commissioner Joseph A. Warren doubled the number of existing units. By 1929, the Emergency Service Squad consisted of eleven trucks and was staffed by over two-hundred and fifty sergeants and patrolmen, and an additional nine trucks and over two hundred more personnel were scheduled to be added in January 1930. 

From its inception, ESS had been under the control of precinct commanders. However, as precinct commanders lacked the training and expertise necessary for the efficient use of the unit's manpower and equipment, on April 10th, 1930 Police Commissioner Grover A. Whalen issued General Order #20, which created the Emergency Service Division and also placed it under the command of Inspector Daniel E. Kerr.

Structure
Field organizations
The 10 Emergency Service Squads (ESS) (or Trucks) are divided geographically as:

ESS-1 (Manhattan South),
ESS-2 (Manhattan North),
ESS-3 (South Bronx),
ESS 4 (North Bronx),
ESS-5 (Staten Island),
ESS-6 (Brooklyn South),
ESS-7 (Brooklyn North),
ESS-8 (Brooklyn North),
ESS-9 (Queens South),
ESS-10(Queens North),
ESS-11 (Assigned to SOD/ESU Headquarters), Floyd Bennett Field.
ESS-14 Hazmat/Rescue Truck,
Additional specialized vehicles strategically stored at designated squad locations
ESS-11 is not a patrol squad but a vehicle manned by trainers and support staff assigned to ESU headquarters at Floyd Bennett Field and can respond to nearby incidents or as back-up to other Emergency Service Squads when required.

Lieutenants/Sergeants are assigned as citywide patrol supervisors to supervise multiple "trucks" (squads).[10] They patrol as either U-5 (Brooklyn, Queens and Staten Island) or U-4 (Manhattan and the Bronx) and respond to major incidents within their assigned boroughs for the tour.

Apprehension Tactical Team:

The Apprehension Tactical Team or "A-Team" is ESU's full-time tactical element which operates citywide. It was originally stood up as a unit in 1989 in order to supplement the ESU's sometimes overwhelming requirement to perform raids throughout the city. A-Team members strictly perform tactical missions which, on a day-to-day basis are typically High-Risk search warrants. The A-Team is widely considered to have the highest operational tempo of any US tactical team, sometimes performing as many as 800–1,000 missions per year. The team can be called upon to support any unit within the NYPD, federal law enforcement agencies or outside police departments upon official request for tactical entries. Members of the Apprehension Team are also utilized as tactical and firearms trainers both within ESU and to other NYPD units. Members of the team are recruited from within ESU, based on team needs, and assignment to the team is highly selective. A-Team members are required to maintain all of their periodic ESU certifications and proficiencies, and must be able to support the ESU on any type of operation should the need arise.

Canine Team:

The Canine Team has 44 dogs that assist in searches for perpetrators and missing persons.[11] The unit includes three bloodhounds and several dogs cross-trained in cadaver recovery. The ESU canines are an integral part of the US-TF1 Urban Search and Rescue (USAR) Team as deployed by the Federal Emergency Management Agency (FEMA).

Hazmat/Weapons of Mass Destruction Team:

The Hazmat/Weapons of Mass Destruction Team is tasked with investigating and responding to any chemical, biological, radiological, nuclear and explosive (CBRNE) incidents and also assisting the Bomb Squad on suspicious package calls.

Emergency Medical Squad:

The Emergency Service Unit also staffs a full time medical squad. Their primary mission is to provide non-emergent medical services to active officers and their families along with retirees. The unit will also sit on standby at high risk operations by other units within the department in case of injury, to eliminate having to wait for a responding ambulance from the 911 system. Officers assigned to the medical squad possess a minimum of a New York State EMT-Basic certification and should have prior experience working as an EMT. Before being assigned to the medical squad, officers must pass a series of interviews along with a physical agility test demonstrating their ability to carry patients and equipment. The unit maintains at least 2 ambulances fully stocked to the New York State Department of Health standard. Their base is located in Queens.

Vehicles
The Emergency Service Unit currently utilizes numerous vehicles including:

 Eleven Heavy Rescue trucks which are referred to as "Trucks". Trucks 1–10 were built by Saulsbury Fire Apparatus (now part of E-One). Truck 11 was built by Ferrara Fire Apparatus.
 40 Radio Emergency Patrol (REP) trucks, which are referred to as "Cars", are ESU's work horse and used for regular patrol. Each REP is equipped with SCUBA gear, emergency medical equipment, rope rescue equipment, forcible entry equipment and rescue equipment including hydraulic rams and the Hurst Tool (Jaws of Life). REP trucks are built by Odyssey Specialty Vehicles.
 ESU's Emergency Medical Squad mans two ambulances.
 Four Lenco BearCat and two Lenco Peacekeeper armored vehicles 1 International POT (Photo Observation Truck), 1 Lenco BEAR (Ballistic Engineered Armored Rescue Vehicle).
 14 portable light tower generator units stationed throughout the city. In addition to the towers, ESU can also deploy 60 kW, 90 kW, 100 kW and 200 kW generators upon request for additional power when required.
 Four Mobile Light Generators which are specialized light-power units with tower generators mounted in the bed of pickup trucks.
 100 kW mobile generator trucks designated as Mobile Auxiliary Light Truck (MALT)s. It has the capability of supplying enough power to light up Grand Central Terminal.
 Construction Accident Response Vehicles (CARV) which responds to construction accidents and is used to stabilize structures and rescue entrapped workers/personnel.
 Emergency Support Vehicle (ESV) which is complete with a motorized Zodiac inflatable boat and deployable rescue airbag.
 ESU also has Twelve jet skis, plus numerous Zodiac inflatable boats assigned to units throughout the NYPD.
 Two custom ambulances built on Ford F-450 chassis

Recruitment
The personnel selected for ESU become highly trained members of the NYPD who perform rescue, SWAT and other high risk tactical, counter-narcotic and counter-terror operations.

There are minimum time-in-grade requirements before an NYPD officer can apply to transfer to ESU. Police Officers must have a minimum of 5 years in the department with a minimum annual rating of 3.5. Supervisors in the rank of sergeants and lieutenants must have 2 years in rank before being assigned to ESU. In addition, all ESU candidates must be approved by a group of current ESU members to ensure that they will integrate into the unit successfully. 

Applicants have to complete the Specialized Training School over eight months receiving training in multiple disciplines including tactical, search and rescue, hazardous materials containment and become certified in SCUBA diving and as an Emergency Medical Technician. Tactical training includes room clearing, team movements, close quarter battle, a week of active shooter training and three weeks of specialized and heavy weapons training. ESU officers are equipped with the Colt M4 Commando rifle.

Casualties/line of duty deaths
ESU lost more members (14 out of 23 NYPD officers) than any other NYPD unit during the World Trade Center attacks on September 11, 2001.

ESU in popular culture

Books
 330 Park a novel by Stanley Cohen
 Sniper's Moon a novel by Carsten Stroud
 E-Man: Life in the NYPD Emergency Service Unit – Al Sheppard's story of ten years in the Emergency Services Unit
 NYPD - On the streets with the Emergency Service Unit by Samuel Katz (1995)
 Anytime, Anywhere! by Samuel Katz (1997)
 Uncommon Valor: Insignia of the NYPD Emergency Service Unit by Andrew G. Nelson (2015)
 Uncommon Valor II: Challenge Coins of the NYPD Emergency Service Unit by Andrew G. Nelson (2017)
 Some Very Special Men - The Emergency Service to the Rescue by Cy Egan (1974)
 Police Emergency Squad No, 1 by Stephen H. Schwartz (1974)

Films
 Fourteen Hours (1951)
 Leon (1994) (also known as The Professional and Léon: The Professional)
 Godzilla (1998)
 The Bone Collector (1999)
 Phone Booth (2002)
 Inside Man (2006)
 16 Blocks (2006)
 World Trade Center (2006)
 Spider-Man 3 (2007)
 The Day the Earth Stood Still (2008)
 Watchmen (2009)
 The Taking of Pelham 123 (2009)

Television series
Also seen extensively in:
 Elementary (2012–2019)
 Blue Bloods (2010–present)
 Castle (2009–2016)
 CSI: NY (2004–13)
 Law & Order (1990–2010), and its various spinoffs
Law & Order: Special Victims Unit, L&O: SVU (1999–present)
Law & Order: Criminal Intent, L&O:CI (2001–11)
Law & Order: Trial by Jury, L&O:TBJ (2005–06)
Law & Order: Organized Crime, L&O: OC (2021–present)
 NYPD Blue (1993–2005)
 Person of Interest (2011–2016)
 Third Watch (1999–2005)
 True Blue (1989-1990)
 Luke Cage (2016)
 Homeland (2017)
 Brooklyn Nine-Nine (2018)
 24 (season 8 only, 2018)
 The Blacklist (season 6) (E2) ESU guards escorting Reddington
 Only Murders in the Building (season 1)
 FBI: Most Wanted (Season 3, Ep.9 "Run-Hide-Fight". Some scenes)

Video games
 Max Payne

See also
 SWAT
 New York City Police Department

References

External links 
 NYPD official website
 EMS World magazine July 2018 issue For Big Trouble in the Big Apple, Call the ESU
  

Emergency Service Unit
1920 establishments in New York City